El combate (English title: The combat) is a Mexican telenovela produced by Irene Sabido for Televisa in 1980.

Cast 
Ignacio López Tarso as Marcial
Alicia Rodríguez as Rosario
Alicia Palacios as Aurelia
Pancho Córdova as Caritino
Rosa Furman as Raquel
Eugenia Avendaño as Generosa
Graciela Orozco as Gudelia
Laura Flores as Mariana
Antonio Henaine as Ramon
Adriana Laffan as Beatriz
Tony Carbajal as Diego
Alfredo Sevilla as Juan Manuel
Lupita Sandoval as Lupita
Rigoberto Carmona as Conrado
Luciano Hernandez de la Vega as Don Severo
Lupelena Goyeneche as Chagua
Rosa Elena Diaz as Catalina
Jaime Puga as Chema
Rodrigo Puebla as Vicente
Antonio Ruiz as José Luis

References

External links 

Mexican telenovelas
1980 telenovelas
Televisa telenovelas
Spanish-language telenovelas
1980 Mexican television series debuts
1980 Mexican television series endings